

Notable Firms
Below is a list of notable impact investing organizations.

References

Social finance
Investment
Corporate social responsibility
Economy and the environment